Trench raiding clubs were imrprovised melee weapons used by both the Allies and the Central Powers during World War I. Clubs were used during nighttime trench raiding expeditions as a quiet and effective way of killing or wounding enemy soldiers. The clubs were usually made out of wood. It was common practice to fix a metal object at the striking end (e.g. an empty Mills bomb) in order to maximize the injury inflicted. Another common design comprised a simple stave with the end drilled out and a lead weight inserted, with rows of large hobnails hammered in around its circumference. Most designs had some form of cord or leather strap at the end to wrap around the user's wrist. Bosnian soldiers serving in the Austro-Hungarian army were fond of using maces. They were also used by officers to finish enemy soldiers wounded by poison gas attacks.

Trench clubs were manufactured in bulk by units based behind the lines. Typically, regimental carpenters and metal workers would make large numbers of the same design of club.

They were generally used along with other melee weapons such as trench knives, entrenching tools, bayonets, hatchets, hammers, and pickaxe handles – backed up with handguns, shotguns, submachine guns, and hand grenades.

In popular culture
In the 1986 Vietnam War film Platoon the character Rhah (played by Francesco Quinn) carries a crude wooden staff wrapped in barbed wire, which resembles a makeshift trench club.
In the film Defendor, the title character uses a trench club on a chain as his primary weapon and states that it had once belonged to his grandfather.
In the video game Team Fortress 2, a trench club is usable as a melee weapon by the Scout Class, under the name "Boston Basher".
In the video game Battlefield 1, players can use trench clubs as melee weapons.
In the video game Verdun, a trench club is available for use by the Canadian raiders.
In the Netflix television series Stranger Things, the character Steve (played by Joe Keery) carries a trench club made from a baseball bat as his weapon of choice.
In the comic series and its television adaptation The Walking Dead, the character Negan (played by Jeffrey Dean Morgan in the show) carries a baseball bat wrapped in barbed wire, a makeshift trench club he affectionately nicknames "Lucille."
In the movie The King's Man, trench clubs are used alongside trench knives and axes during a close-quarter fight between British soldiers and German Sturmtruppen.

See also
 Hand-to-hand combat
 Trench warfare

References

External links
 Trench clubs from the collection of Imperial War Museums
 Photo of hob-nailed trench club in a private collection
 Account of a raid where a trench club was used to kill an officer

World War I infantry weapons
Improvised weapons
Clubs (weapon)